Louis Mustillo (born May 28, 1958) is an American actor who is best known as playing Vincent “Vince” Moranto on Mike & Molly from 2010 to 2016.

Life and career
Mustillo was born in Buffalo, New York. He attended American Academy of Dramatic Arts, where he was a contemporary of the Canadian actor, Elias Koteas, and Illeana Douglas. According to the American Academy's 1983 graduation program, Mustillo and Douglas graduated from the Academy's two year program in a ceremony held at NYC's Winter Garden Theatre on April 26, 1983. They were not asked back to the school's third year, known as The Production Company year.

He has guest starred in more than 50 episodes of television, including an early appearance as a controversial comic on Night Court, and has appeared in over 20 films. He was a series regular on Man of the People with James Garner. He also played Russell Topps for two seasons on DreamWorks first hour-long drama, High Incident. He had a recurring role on The Sopranos as a mafia-associated landscaping business owner, Salvatore "Sal" Vitro. He appeared in The Narrows, and he played sports writer Maury Allen on the ESPN mini-series The Bronx is Burning. Louis also wrote and starred in Bartenders, a one man show that ran for a year at the John Houseman Theatre in New York City.

He also had a regular role in the CBS sitcom Mike & Molly playing Vince, a love interest and later husband of Molly's mother.

Personal life 
He is married to Tricia Brown.

Filmography

References

External links

1958 births
20th-century American male actors
21st-century American male actors
American Academy of Dramatic Arts alumni
American male film actors
American male television actors
Living people
Male actors from Buffalo, New York